Dwayne Gordon (born November 2, 1969) is a former American football player who played linebacker in the National Football League from 1993 through 2000. He played college football at the University of New Hampshire.

1969 births
Living people
American football linebackers
New Hampshire Wildcats football players
Atlanta Falcons players
San Diego Chargers players
New York Jets players
Played football at Arlington High School in Lagrangeville, NY.